The 1801 New Hampshire gubernatorial election took place on March 10, 1801. Incumbent Federalist Governor John Taylor Gilman won re-election to an eighth term, defeating Democratic-Republican candidate Timothy Walker in a re-match of the previous year's election.

Results

References 

Gubernatorial
New Hampshire
1801